Ovarian disorders may refer to diseases primarily affecting, or centered on, the ovaries.

Some examples of ovarian diseases are:
 Polycystic ovary syndrome (PCOS)
 Turner syndrome
 Hypogonadism
 Ovarian cancer